The 1990 480 km of Spa was the fourth round of the 1990 World Sportscar Championship season, taking place at Circuit de Spa-Francorchamps, Belgium.  It took place on June 3, 1990.

Official results
Class winners in bold.  Cars failing to complete 75% of the winner's distance marked as Not Classified (NC).

Statistics
 Pole Position - #1 Team Sauber Mercedes - 1:59.350
 Fastest Lap - #1 Team Sauber Mercedes - 2:06.211
 Average Speed - 178.916 km/h

External links
 WSPR-Racing - 1990 Spa results

Spa
Spa
6 Hours of Spa-Francorchamps